Beneath Her Window is a 2003 Slovenian film directed by Metod Pevec. It was Slovenia's submission to the 77th Academy Awards for the Academy Award for Best Foreign Language Film, but was not accepted as a nominee. The main role was played by Polona Juh.

Cast 
 Polona Juh - Duša
 Marijana Brecelj - Mother Vanda
 Saša Tabaković - Jasha
 Robert Prebil - Boris
 Zlatko Šugman - Grandfather
 Jožica Avbelj - Joži
 Andrej Nahtigal - Mirko
 Primož Petkovšek - Tone
 Tijana Zinajić - Meta
 Lotos Vincenc Šparovec - Astrologist

See also
List of submissions to the 77th Academy Awards for Best Foreign Language Film

References

External links

2003 films
2003 drama films
Slovene-language films
Slovenian drama films